The Atlantic County Special Services School District is a special education public school district located in the Mays Landing section of Hamilton Township, serving the educational needs of classified students ages 3 to 21 from Atlantic County, New Jersey, United States.

As of the 2014-15 school year, the district and its two schools had an enrollment of 411 students and 67.4 classroom teachers (on an FTE basis), for a student–teacher ratio of 6.1:1.

Administration
Core members of the district's administration are:
Philip J. Guenther, Superintendent
Lisa Mooney, Business Manager

References

External links
Atlantic County Special Services School District

Data for the Atlantic County Special Services School District, National Center for Education Statistics

Hamilton Township, Atlantic County, New Jersey
School districts in Atlantic County, New Jersey